The 2014 Mongolian Premier League also known as Niislel Lig or Capital League is the 47th edition of the tournament. Ulaanbaataryn Mazaalaynuud returned to the league after withdrawing from competition in the 2012 season, replacing Khasiin Khulguud to keep the number of teams at seven. The season started on 25 June and ended with the championship match on 30 August 2013. The top four teams in the standings advanced to the single elimination playoff stage.

Clubs

Clubs and locations

League table

Results

First round

Final stages

Semifinals

Third place playoff match

Final

References

Mongolia Premier League seasons
Mongolia
Mongolia
football